Phùng Khắc Khoan (1528–1613), known as Trạng Bùng, was a noted 16th-century Vietnamese military strategist, politician, diplomat and poet during the Later Lê dynasty warlord period.

Phung Khac Khoan headed the diplomatic corps to China during the Ming, during which he took part in a notable summit colloquy, conducted in writing, with the Korean historian Yi Su-gwang in 1597.

References

Sources
Phan Huy Chú, tiểu truyện "Phùng Khắc Khoan" trong Lịch triều hiến chương loại chí (bản dịch, tập 1). Nhà xuất bản Khoa học xã hội, 1992.
Bùi Duy Tân, mục từ: "Phùng Khắc khoan" tronng Từ điển văn học (bộ mới). Nhà xuất bản Thế giới, 2004.
Trịnh Vân Thanh, Thành ngữ-điển tích-danh nhân từ điển (quyển 2). Nhà xuất bản Hồn Thiêng, Sài Gòn, 1966.
Trần Văn Giáp, Tìm hiểu kho sách Hán Nôm (trọn bộ). Nhà xuất bản Khoa học xã hội, 2003.
Trần Thị Băng Thanh (chủ biên), Văn học thế kỷ XV-XVII. Nhà xuất bản Khoa học xã hội, 2004.

1528 births
1613 deaths
People from Hanoi
Vietnamese Confucianists
Vietnamese male poets
Lê dynasty officials
Mạc dynasty
16th-century Vietnamese poets
16th-century Vietnamese philosophers
17th-century Vietnamese philosophers